Bian Hongmin (Chinese: 边洪敏; pinyin: Biān Hóngmǐn; born September 22, 1989 in Hangzhou, Zhejiang) is a male Chinese volleyball player. He was part of the silver medal-winning team at the 2007 U19 World Youth Championship.

He competed for Team China at the 2008 Summer Olympics in Beijing, China.

References
 Profile 

1989 births
Living people
Chinese men's volleyball players
Olympic volleyball players of China
Sportspeople from Hangzhou
Volleyball players at the 2008 Summer Olympics
Volleyball players at the 2010 Asian Games
Volleyball players from Zhejiang
Asian Games competitors for China
21st-century Chinese people